Apostolic World Christian Fellowship (AWCF) is an alliance of Oneness Pentecostal organizations that include 181 organizations, 20,200 ministers, and 5.2 million members worldwide.  It was founded in 1971 by Worthy G. Rowe, a pastor in South Bend, Indiana, out of a desire for unity among the smaller Oneness Pentecostal organizations. Excluded from other pan-Pentecostal organizations such as the Pentecostal and Charismatic Churches of North America and the Pentecostal World Fellowship, Oneness organizations utilize the AWCF to assess numerical growth and initiate joint-evangelistic efforts. In May 1991. W.G. Rowe was succeeded by Bishop Samuel L. Smith as the General Chairman of the AWCF.

References

Oneness Pentecostal denominations